The Estadio Marte Rodolfo Gómez Segura is a multi-use stadium in Ciudad Victoria, Tamaulipas, Mexico.  It is currently used mostly for football matches and is the home stadium for Correcaminos UAT.  The stadium has a capacity of 10,520 people and opened in 1938.

References

External links
Stadium information

Sports venues in Tamaulipas
Ciudad Victoria
Athletics (track and field) venues in Mexico
College association football venues in Mexico
Marte R. Gomez
1939 establishments in Mexico
Sports venues completed in 1939